Maharajadhiraj Raj Rajeshwar Sawai Shri Sir Yeshwant Rao II Holkar XIV Bahadur (6 September 1908 – 5 December 1961) was the Maharaja of Indore (Holkar State, now in present-day Madhya Pradesh) belonging to the Holkar dynasty of the Marathas.

Biography
He was educated at the Cheam School, Charterhouse and Christ Church, Oxford.

He succeeded his father Tukojirao Holkar III, who abdicated in his favour on 26 February 1926. He was installed on the throne on 11 March 1926 under a regency council. He was invested with full powers on 9 May 1930. On 1 January 1935 he was made a Knight of the Order of the Indian Empire.  He established a legislative council for Indore state and created a cabinet with a prime minister and three ministers. K.S. Fitze, a British resident of Indore, remarked on the great amount of time Maharaja Yeshwant spent abroad.  Christie's art director Amin Jaffer takes this to exemplify his turn to the West.

On 11 August 1947 he signed the document of accession to India. Indore State was included in the Union of Madhya Bharat on 28 May 1948. He served as the second Rajpramukh of this new state until 31 October 1956. He then worked for the United Nations.

He died in a Mumbai hospital on 5 December 1961.

Manik Bagh 
In 1930 he commissioned the construction of the Manik Bagh ("Jewel Garden") palace in Indore. The architect was Eckart Muthesius (1904–1989) from Germany. The Maharaja was at a young age at that time, as was Muthesius who was just a couple of years older. The work outside and inside was done in the late art deco and international style of modern architecture.

The Musée des Arts Décoratifs, Paris had an exhibition in 2019 called "Moderne Maharajah" dedicated to Yashwant Rao Holkar II and Manik Bagh, featuring some of the interior pieces such as the aluminium bed by Louis Sognot and Charlotte Alix.

Manik Bagh later became a branch of the Indian Customs and Central Excise department.

Marriage

In the year 1924 he married Sanyogita Bai Sahib Holkar of Indore. Yeshwant Rao and his wife Maharani Sanyogita both studied in England. Together they traveled Europe extensively and were photographed by Man Ray in a series in 1927. Two sets of double portraits were painted by Bernard Boutet de Monvel in 1929 and 1934.

Sanyogita passed away in 1937 at the age of 22 from complications after surgery in Switzerland.

In 1938 he married Marguerite Lawler, of Fargo, North Dakota, and after their divorce, married in 1943 Euphemia "Fay" Watt, of Los Angeles (aka Lady Fay Holkar).

He is survived by his two children: 
 with Maharani Sanyogita Devi: Maharani Usha Raje of Indore (she inherited the titles and rights)
 with Lady Fay Holkar: Maharajkumar Shrimant Shivaji Rao "Richard" Holkar (who himself has two children: Sabrina Sanyogita Holkar Ellis and Yashwantrao "Randall" Holkar III).

Family Tradition Rigt's
The elder brother of Maharaja Tukojirao holkar II, Raja Srimant Sir Kashirao Dadasaheb Holkar's(KCSI,KIH).
Maharajkumar Bhushansinh Raje Holkar.

Honours
Knight Grand Commander of the Order of the Indian Empire (GCIE), 1935
King George V Silver Jubilee Medal, 1935
King George VI Coronation Medal, 1937

See also
Yeshwant Club
Daly College
Indore State 
Maratha Empire
List of Maratha dynasties and states

References

External links

Members.iinet.net.au
 https://madparis.fr/francais/musees/musee-des-arts-decoratifs/expositions/expositions-terminees/moderne-maharajah-un-mecene-des-annees-1930/

|-

1908 births
1961 deaths
Maharajas of Indore
Knights Grand Commander of the Order of the Indian Empire
People educated at Charterhouse School
Indian knights